The (Roman Catholic) Diocese of Surat Thani (Diœcesis Suratthanensis) in southern Thailand was founded in 1969, when it was split off from the Diocese of Ratchaburi by the papal bull Qui Regno Christi. It is a suffragan diocese of the Archdiocese of Bangkok. The area of Surat Thani was evangelized by the Salesians of Don Bosco in the 1930s.

The diocese covers an area of 76,562 km², covering all of the southern provinces of Thailand, including Prachuap Khiri Khan as its northernmost province. As of 2001, of its nine million citizens, 6,682 or 0.1% are members of the Catholic Church. The diocese is divided into 39 parishes, which are grouped by four regions.

Bishops
Joseph Prathan Sridarunsil, S.D.B.: appointed October 9, 2004
Michael Praphon Chaicharoen, S.D.B.: June 21, 1988 - May 20, 2003 (died)
Pietro Luigi Carretto, S.D.B.: June 26, 1969 - June 21, 1988 (retired)

Cathedral
The church was built in 1962, and became a cathedral when the diocese was established in 1969.

See also
Roman Catholicism in Thailand

References

External links
 Official site
catholic-hierarchy.org 

Surat Thani
Surat Thani
Surat Thani
1969 establishments in Thailand